Men's Downhill World Cup 1992/1993

Final point standings

In Men's Downhill World Cup 1992/93 all results count. Franz Heinzer won his third Downhill title in a row.

References
 fis-ski.com

External links
 

World Cup
FIS Alpine Ski World Cup men's downhill discipline titles